Roger E. Hedlund is an American pastor who has spent more than three decades in India as a theological teacher and researcher with major contributions to missiology with special reference to Indian ethos.

Education
Hedlund studied at the Upland College in 1957 and thereafter undertook theological studies at the Denver Conservative Baptist Seminary where he was awarded the graduate degree of Bachelor of Divinity (B.D.) in 1961. After serving as a missionary in Italy, Hedlund pursued postgraduate and doctoral studies at the Fuller Theological Seminary, Pasadena between 1970-1974. In 2004, Hedlund pursued another doctorate at the State-run University of Madras.

Career
Hedlund taught at the Union Biblical Seminary, both at Yeotmal and at Pune from 1974-1978 and also at the Serampore College from 1994-1997. He is associated with Dharma Deepika: A South Asian Journal of Missiological Research and with the Mylapore Institute for Indigenous Studies (Chennai). Hedlund edited the Oxford Encyclopedia of South Asian Christianity.

Hedlund has been prominent in the theological circles in India and known in the Catholic, Orthodox, Protestant and Charismatic circles serving the cause of missiological research. The papers and correspondence of Roger E. Hedlund have been preserved and made digitally available by the Asbury Theological Seminary, Kentucky.

Selected works

References

Missiologists

Indian Christian theologians
Living people
University of Madras alumni
Fuller Theological Seminary alumni
Baptist writers
1935 births
Missional Christianity
Academic staff of the Senate of Serampore College (University)
American expatriate academics
Academic staff of Union Biblical Seminary, Pune